The Derby of the eternal rivals, also called Mother of all battles (Greek: Μητέρα των μαχών), is the name of the basketball local derby in Athens between Olympiacos and Panathinaikos. The Greek powerhouses have won a combined nine EuroLeague titles since 1996, thus being among the most successful clubs in European basketball history. Panathinaikos basketball club has won 6 EuroLeague titles and Olympiacos has won 3 EuroLeague titles. Their rivalry inside and outside the Greek borders is considered one of the most thrilling in the basketball world.

History

Culture rivalry

The rivalry between the two top Greek clubs can be traced back to some social, cultural and regional differences. Panathinaikos comes from the center of Athens and was considered the classic representative of the old Athenian society and culture. On the other hand, Olympiacos comes from Piraeus and used to represent the middle class of merchants in the port of Piraeus and the world of the working class. However, this kind of clash was much more pronounced in the past, as the class differences between the fanbases have faded out and the social gap that once separated the two sides has closed over the years. Nowadays, both clubs boast fanbases that represent all the social classes.

Basketball rivalry
Panathinaikos is the most successful basketball club in Greece, with Olympiacos being runners-up. The eternal enemies are the most traditional basketball powers as they have been fighting in the top level of the Greek basketball scene longer than any other team.

Their rivalry is highly credited, especially in the 1990s-2000s, when they met each other in several regular season and playoff series, and in some EuroLeague matches which marked their history.

Statistics

Head-to-head

Records
Record Basket League win
Panathinaikos: Panathinaikos - Olympiacos 86–55 (+31), Olympic Indoor Hall (13 February 2005)
home: Panathinaikos - Olympiacos 86–55 (+31), Olympic Indoor Hall (13 February 2005)
away: Olympiacos - Panathinaikos 75–95 (+20), Papastrateio Indoor Hall (1 November 1986)
Olympiacos: Olympiacos - Panathinaikos 73–38 (+35) Peace and Friendship Stadium (19 May 1996)
home: Olympiacos - Panathinaikos 73–38 (+35), Peace and Friendship Stadium (19 May 1996)
away: Panathinaikos - Olympiacos 70–82 (+12), Apostolos Nikolaidis Indoor Hall (31 January 1987)
Record Greek Cup win
Panathinaikos: Olympiacos - Panathinaikos 51–81 (+30), Peace and Friendship Stadium (13 October 2005)
home: Panathinaikos - Olympiacos 85–72 (+13), Olympic Indoor Hall, (21 February 1996)
away: Olympiacos - Panathinaikos 51–81 (+30), Peace and Friendship Stadium (13 October 2005)
Olympiacos: Panathinaikos - Olympiacos 68–110 (+42), Panathinaiko Stadium (1 June 1977)
home: Olympiacos - Panathinaikos 83–75 (+8), Peace and Friendship Stadium (5 April 2002)
away: Panathinaikos - Olympiacos 68–110 (+42), Panathinaiko Stadium (1 June 1977)
Record EuroLeague win
Panathinaikos: Panathinaikos - Olympiacos 93–80 (+13), Olympic Indoor Hall (9 November 2018)
home: Panathinaikos - Olympiacos 93–80 (+13), Olympic Indoor Hall (9 November 2018)
away: Olympiacos - Panathinaikos 77-88 (+11), Peace and Friendship Stadium (5 February 2021)
Olympiacos: Panathinaikos - Olympiacos 49–69 (+20), Olympic Indoor Hall (27 March 1997)
home: Olympiacos - Panathinaikos 92–75 (+17), Peace and Friendship Stadium (28 February 2002)
away: Panathinaikos - Olympiacos 49–69 (+20), Olympic Indoor Hall (27 March 1997)
Longest sequence of Basket League wins
Panathinaikos: 5, 2005–06 to 2006–07
home: 13, 2006-2007 to 2009-10
away: 3, 1982–83 to 1984–85
Olympiacos: 5, 2014 to 2015
home: 12, 1994–95 to 1998–99
away: 2, 1986–87 to 1988–89, 1990–91 to 1992–93, 2014 to 2015 
Longest sequence of Greek Cup wins
Panathinaikos: 6, 6 October 2003 – 22 February 2009
home: 4, 1996 – present
away: 5, 6 October 2003 – present
neutral: 3, 1978-79 to 1985-86
Olympiacos: 3, 14 July 1965 – 9 July 1969 and 3 May 1953 – 7 August 1960
home: 2, 1975 – 25 September 1994
away: 0
neutral: 2, 2009-10 to 2010-11

Matches list

Panhellenic Championship (1928−1963) 

• Matches won: Panathinaikos 5, Olympiacos 3.

Alpha and A1 Ethniki (since 1963–64)

1 Panathinaikos didn't show up in the match, so Olympiacos were awarded a 2–0 win.
2 Match suspended with 2 minutes remaining in the third quarter due to crowd violence (score: 52–62). Panathinaikos were awarded the win with the score standing.
3 Match suspended with 1:03 remaining in the final quarter due to crowd violence (score: 69–76). Panathinaikos were awarded a 0–20 win.
4 Match suspended with 1:27 remaining in the final quarter due to crowd violence (score: 72–76). Panathinaikos were awarded a 0–20 win.
5 Olympiacos didn't show up in the match, so Panathinaikos were awarded a 0–20 win.
6 Olympiacos didn't show up in the match, so Panathinaikos were awarded a 20–0 win.
7 Olympiacos didn't show up in the match, so Panathinaikos were awarded a 0–20 win.
• Matches won: Panathinaikos 112, Olympiacos 93.

Greek Cup

1 Panathinaikos won the Greek Cup semifinal (20-0), after Olympiacos decided to forfeit the game in protest at refereeing decisions.

• Matches won: Panathinaikos 19, Olympiacos 9.

Euroleague

• Matches won: Olympiacos 15, Panathinaikos 7.

Head-to-head ranking

• Total: Panathinaikos 44 times higher, Olympiacos 14 times higher.

Players in both clubs

Coaches in both clubs
  Kostas Mourouzis
  Kostas Anastasatos
  Michalis Kyritsis
   Lefteris Subotić

Played for one club and coached the rival club

  Faidon Matthaiou (Panathinaikos as player, Olympiacos as coach)
  Panagiotis Giannakis (Panathinaikos as player, Olympiacos as coach)

See also
Derby of the eternal enemies
El Clásico

References

External links
 Official HEBA Site
 Official Hellenic Basketball Federation Site
 Sport.gr in Greek

Basketball rivalries
Basketball in Greece
Panathinaikos B.C.
Olympiacos B.C.